Line 1 of Hohhot Metro is a rapid transit line in Hohhot, Inner Mongolia, China.

It was opened on 29 December 2019. The color for Line 1 is red.

Opening timeline

Stations

References

01
2019 establishments in China
Railway lines opened in 2019
Airport rail links in China